Shapeshifter is the debut album by American metalcore band The Dead Rabbitts. It was released on July 1, 2014.

Background 
This album was released a year after the band's debut EP Edge of Reality was released. Before the announcement, the band toured with Metalcore band Eyes Set to Kill in the Arizona, US. In November 2013, the band signed with Tragic Hero Records and announced that they will be releasing an album sometime in 2014. and In December 2013. they began recording songs with Andrew Wade.

The album was announced by the band a month prior to its release on May 16 and stated that the album would be released on July 1, 2014, through Tragic Hero Records.

Promotion
"My Only Regret" was released as the debut single off the album on May 16, 2014, along with its lyric video.
The second single "Shapeshifter" was released on June 3, 2014.
The third single "Bats In the Belfry" was released on June 21, 2014. and the band premiered a music video for "Deer In the Headlights" on November 7, 2014.

Tour
In support of the album, The band embarked on ShapeshifTour, which took place
from June 20 to July 26, 2014. Support for the tour included The Relapse Symphony, Myka Relocate, and Nightmares. for the 28-date summer trek.

Critical reception

Shapeshifter was met with positive reception by critics. In a four-star review for Revolver, David McKenna averring, "Fans of post-hardcore will definitely want to check this album out."

Track listing

Personnel
Album personnel as listed on Allmusic

The Dead Rabbitts
 Craig Mabbitt – lead vocals
 TJ Bell – bass, backing clean and unclean vocals
 Alex Torres – lead guitar, backing clean vocals
 Chris Julian – drums

Additional personnel
 Rob Pierce – drums on "Deer in the Headlights" music video
 Caleb Shomo – songwriter, guest vocals on "Make Me Believe It"
 Augustus Cryns – songwriter, guitar, bass, background vocals
 Andrew Wade – producer, mixing, mastering

Charts

References

Tragic Hero Records albums
2014 albums
The Dead Rabbits albums
Albums produced by Andrew Wade